Lee David Cox (born 26 June 1990) is an English professional footballer who most recently played for  side Coalville Town, where he played as a midfielder.

Playing career
Cox was born in Leicester. He began his career when he joined Leicester City as a 13-year-old. He was a member of the youth team that won the Premier Academy League in the 2006–07 season and signed his first professional contract in May 2008. Cox was loaned to Yeovil Town for a month in January 2009, but returned to Leicester without making a first-team appearance. He was released by the club that summer and signed a one-year contract with Inverness Caledonian Thistle in June. In his first season with the club, Cox won the Scottish Football League First Division title and promotion to the Scottish Premier League.

He signed a two-year contract extension in April 2010. Having made 67 league appearances for Inverness, Cox was transferred to Swindon Town in January 2012 for an undisclosed fee on a two-and-a-half-year contract. He made seven appearances in his first two months with Swindon but lost his place in March and did not play again before the club won the Football League Two title. Cox was transfer-listed in June, and joined Oxford United on loan until January 2013 the following month. He made 19 appearances for Oxford in all competitions before returning to Swindon when the clubs were unable to agree terms on an extension.

In February 2013, Cox joined Plymouth Argyle on loan until the end of the season. He played regularly in his first two months with the club, making ten league appearances, before suffering a shoulder injury in a 1–0 win against Exeter City. Cox required surgery to repair torn ligaments, which would prevent him from playing for six months. "It's a crying shame as he has been a big lift for us," said Argyle manager John Sheridan.

On 12 May 2014, Cox signed for Plymouth Argyle on a free transfer following his release from Swindon Town.

On 26 November 2015, Cox signed for Stevenage on loan from Plymouth Argyle.

on 10 January 2016, Cox returned to Argyle as his loan deal expired.

In July 2017, Cox joined Coalville Town.

Career statistics
.

Honours
Premier Academy League: 2006–07
Scottish Football League First Division: 2009–10

References

External links
 
 

1990 births
Living people
Footballers from Leicester
English footballers
Association football midfielders
Leicester City F.C. players
Yeovil Town F.C. players
Inverness Caledonian Thistle F.C. players
Swindon Town F.C. players
Oxford United F.C. players
Plymouth Argyle F.C. players
Stevenage F.C. players
Brackley Town F.C. players
Coalville Town F.C. players
Scottish Football League players
Scottish Premier League players
English Football League players